Mezajin (also Romanized as Mezajīn; also known as Mazjīnī, Mezahjīn, and Mizin) is a village in Khanandabil-e Sharqi Rural District, in the Central District of Khalkhal County, Ardabil Province, Iran. At the 2006 census, its population was 542, in 124 families.

References 

Towns and villages in Khalkhal County